This is a list of prominent individuals and organizations who endorsed the National Equality March.

Organizations

National LGBT organizations
 Human Rights Campaign
 Gay and Lesbian Alliance Against Defamation (GLAAD) 
 
 Universal Fellowship of Metropolitan Community Churches
 National Gay and Lesbian Task Force
 Gay, Lesbian and Straight Education Network
 BiNet USA
 Immigration Equality
 
 Parents, Families and Friends of Lesbians and Gays (P-FLAG)

Others
 Screen Actors Guild
 National Organization for Women
 Unitarian Universalist Association
 Associated Students of Madison Student Council

Individuals

Elected officials
 US. Senate Majority Leader Harry Reid (D-Nev.)
 U.S. Congresswoman Tammy Baldwin (D-Wisc.)
 Sen. State Senator Tom Duane (D-N.Y.)
 San Francisco Supervisor Bevan Dufty
 Assembly Member Micah Kellner (D-N.Y.)
 Assembly Member Daniel O'Donnell (D-N.Y.)
 New York City Council Speaker Christine Quinn

Other political officials
 Former U.S. Congressman Ed Feighan
 Former California Sen. Sheila Kuehl
 President and CEO Chuck Wolfe of Victory Fund
 Richard Socarides,  adviser under United States President Bill Clinton
 Paul Yandura, former leader of the National Stonewall Democrats

LGBT rights leaders
Neil Giuliano
Cleve Jones
David Mixner
Nicole Murray-Ramirez
Ann Northup
Judy Shepard
Nadine Smith
Sean Strub
Urvashi Vaid
Chip Arndt

Actors
 Annette Bening
 Neve Campbell
 Gavin Creel
 Wilson Cruz
 Alan Cumming
 Dana Delany
 Joely Fisher
 James Franco
 Mariska Hargitay
 Helen Hunt
 Chad Lowe
 Camryn Manheim
 Ewan McGregor
 Ian McKellen
 Julianne Moore
 Kathy Najimy
 Peter Paige
 David Hyde Pierce
 Anthony Rapp
 Meg Ryan
 Hilary Swank
 Jennifer Tilly
 Marisa Tomei
 Charlize Theron
 Judith Light
 Laura Benanti
 Alan Cumming
 Harvey Fierstein
 Celia Keenan-Bolger
 Beth Broderick
 Scott Evans
 Mark Lawson
 Alec Mapa
 Larry Sullivan
 Chad Allen
 David Drake
 Calpernia Addams
 Ann Hampton Callaway
 Holly Near
 Bruce Vilanch

Writers, producers, and directors
Greg Berlanti
Ilene Chaiken
David Marshall Grant
Max Mutchnick
Felice Picano
 Bruce Cohen
 Dan Jinks
 Dustin Lance Black
 Michael Kearns
 Jamie McGonnigal
Gus Van Sant

Radio, literary authors, journalists, and blog writers
David Bender
Michelangelo Signorile
Richard Berengarten
Lane Hudson
Doug Ireland
Jonathan Katz
Eric Marcus
Andy Towle

Others
Scott Fujita, New Orleans Saints linebacker.
 Rabbi Eric Yoffie, President of the Union for Reform Judaism
Melissa Etheridge
Dave Koz
 Rev. Troy Perry
 Dr. Tony Mills
 Judge David Young
 Kate Clinton

References

External links
List of religious leaders who endorsed the National Equality March

LGBT civil rights demonstrations
Protest marches in Washington, D.C.
LGBT events in the United States
2009 in the United States
Marching
LGBT rights in the United States
LGBT culture in Washington, D.C.